Human rights in China are periodically reviewed by the United Nations Human Rights Committee (UNHRC), on which the Chinese Communist Party (CCP), government of the People's Republic of China (PRC) and various foreign governments and human rights organizations have often disagreed. CCP and PRC authorities, their supporters, and other proponents claim that existing policies and enforcement measures are sufficient to guard against human rights abuses. However other countries and their authorities (such as the United States Department of State, Global Affairs Canada, etc.), international non-governmental organizations (NGOs) including Human Rights in China and Amnesty International, and citizens, lawyers, and dissidents inside the country, state that the authorities in mainland China regularly sanction or organize such abuses.

Independent NGOs such as Amnesty International and Human Rights Watch, as well as foreign governmental institutions such as the U.S. State Department, regularly present evidence of the PRC violating the freedoms of speech, movement, and religion of its citizens and of others within its jurisdiction. Authorities in the PRC claim to define human rights differently, so as to include economic and social as well as political rights, all in relation to "national culture" and the level of development of the country. Authorities in the PRC, referring to this definition, claim that human rights are being improved. They do not, however, use the definition used by most countries and organizations. PRC politicians have repeatedly maintained that, according to the PRC Constitution, the "Four Cardinal Principles" supersede citizenship rights. PRC officials interpret the primacy of the Four Cardinal Principles as a legal basis for the arrest of people who the government says seek to overthrow the principles. Chinese nationals whom authorities perceive to be in compliance with these principles, on the other hand, are permitted by the PRC authorities to enjoy and exercise all the rights that come with citizenship of the PRC, provided they do not violate PRC laws in any other manner.

Numerous human rights groups have publicized human rights issues in mainland China that they consider the government to be mishandling, including: the death penalty (capital punishment), the one-child policy (in which China had made exceptions for ethnic minorities prior to abolishing it in 2015), the political and legal status of Tibet, and neglect of freedom of the press in mainland China. Other areas of concern include the lack of legal recognition of human rights and the lack of an independent judiciary, rule of law, and due process. Further issues raised in regard to human rights include the severe lack of worker's rights (in particular the hukou system which restricts migrant labourers' freedom of movement), the absence of labour unions independent of the CCP, the implementation of Social Credit System and its blacklist, which serval restricting the person and its family member's freedom of movement and many others, and allegations of discrimination against rural workers and ethnic minorities, as well as the lack of religious freedom rights groups have highlighted repression of the Christian, Tibetan Buddhist, Uyghur Muslim, and Falun Gong religious groups. Some Chinese activist groups are trying to expand these freedoms, including Human Rights in China, Chinese Human Rights Defenders, and the China Human Rights Lawyers Concern Group. Chinese human rights attorneys who take on cases related to these issues, however, often face harassment, disbarment, and arrest.

According to the Amnesty International report from 2016/2017 the government continued to draft and enact a series of new national security laws that presented serious threats to the protection of human rights. The nationwide crackdown on human rights lawyers and activists continued throughout the year. Activists and human rights defenders continued to be systematically subjected to monitoring, harassment, intimidation, arrest and detention. The report continues that police detained increasing numbers of human rights defenders outside of formal detention facilities, sometimes without access to a lawyer for long periods, exposing the detainees to the risk of torture and other ill-treatment. Booksellers, publishers, activists and a journalist who went missing in neighboring countries in 2015 and 2016 turned up at detention in China, causing concerns about China's law enforcement agencies acting outside their jurisdiction. In June 2020, nearly 50 UN independent experts raised wide-ranging concerns over the repression of “fundamental freedoms” by the Chinese government. They highlighted the collective repression of the population, especially religious and ethnic minorities, to the detention of lawyers, prosecution and human rights defenders. They also denounced "impunity for excessive use of force by police, the alleged use of chemical agents against protesters, the alleged sexual harassment and assault of women protesters in police stations, and the alleged harassment of health care workers".

Legal system

Since the legal reforms of the late 1970s and 1980s, the CCP has officially moved to embrace the language of the rule of law and to establish a modern court system. In the process, it has enacted thousands of new laws and regulations, and has begun training more legal professionals. The concept of 'rule of law' has been emphasized in the constitution, and the ruling party has embarked on campaigns to promote the idea that citizens have protection under the law. At the same time, however, a fundamental contradiction exists in the constitution itself, in which the Communist Party insists that its authority supersedes that of the law. Thus, the constitution enshrines the rule of law, yet simultaneously stresses the principle that the 'leadership of the Communist Party' holds primacy over the law. Even some Chinese themselves have only a vague conception of the priority of the CCP leadership over constitutional and legal authority.

The judiciary is not independent of the Communist Party, and judges face political pressure; in many instances, private party committees dictate the outcome of cases. In this way, the CCP effectively controls the judiciary through its influence. This influence has produced a system often described as 'rule by law' (alluding to the CCP's power), rather than rule of law. Moreover, the legal system lacks protections for civil rights, and often fails to uphold due process. This is opposed to a system of checks and balances or separation of powers.

Foreign experts estimate that in 2000, there were between 1.5 million and 4 million people in prison in mainland China. The PRC does not allow outsiders to inspect the penal system.

Civil liberties

Freedom of speech

Although the 1982 constitution guarantees freedom of speech, the Chinese government often uses the "subversion of state power" and "protection of state secrets" clauses in their law system to imprison those who criticize the government. Another crime used to jail critics such as Sun Dawu is "picking quarrels and provoking trouble".

During the 2008 Summer Olympics, the government promised to issue permits authorizing people to protest in specifically designated "protest parks" in Beijing. However, a majority of the applications were withdrawn, suspended, or vetoed, and the police detained some of the people who applied.

References to certain controversial events and political movements, as well as access to web pages considered by the PRC authorities to be "dangerous" or "threatening to state security", are blocked on the internet in the PRC; and content disputed by or critical of PRC authorities is absent from many publications, and subject to the control of the CCP within mainland China. Laws in the People's Republic of China forbid the advocacy of separation of any part of its claimed territory from mainland China, or public challenge to the CCP's domination of the government of China. An unsanctioned protest during the Olympics by seven foreign activists at the China Nationalities Museum, protesting for a free Tibet and blocking the entrance, was cleared and the protesters deported.

Foreign Internet search engines including Microsoft Bing, Yahoo!, and Google China have come under criticism for aiding these practices. Yahoo!, in particular, stated that it will not protect the privacy and confidentiality of its Chinese customers from the authorities.

In 2005, after Yahoo! China provided its personal emails and IP addresses to the Chinese government, reporter Shi Tao was sentenced to imprisonment for ten years for releasing an internal Communist Party document to an overseas Chinese democracy site. Skype president Josh Silverman said it was "common knowledge" that TOM Online had "established procedures to...block instant messages containing certain words deemed offensive by the Chinese authorities". In June 2020, the European Union demanded an immediate release of Yu Wensheng, who after two years in detention, was sentenced on charges of “inciting subversion of state power”, for writing an open letter demanding constitutional reforms.

On 24 July 2020, the CCP expelled an outspoken and influential property tycoon, Ren Zhiqiang, who denounced the country's authoritarian leader, CCP general secretary Xi Jinping. He went missing in March after criticizing Xi, and later his case was passed to the judiciary system
for criminal investigation.

On 29 July 2020, the Chinese government begun applying the new National Security Law to suppress peaceful speech, curtail academic freedom, and generate a chilling effect on the fundamental freedoms in Hong Kong.

On 11 August 2020, Human Rights Watch demanded Chinese authorities on the basis of security law to immediately release the 10 democracy supporters and activists arrested on 10 August and drop all vague “national security” charges imposed on them.

In June 2020, Cai Xia, a retired professor of CCP's Central Party School, criticized Xi Jinping, the General Secretary of the CCP, called him a "mafia boss" and the ruling Communist Party a "political zombie". In a 20-minute audio on social networking sites, she said that everyone is Xi's slave, and there is no human rights and rule of law, She suggested that Xi should retire. On 17 August 2020, Cai Xia was expelled from the CCP's Central Party School and her  retirement pensions were cancelled.

Freedom of speech during Coronavirus crisis of 2020
During the Coronavirus crisis of 2020, the PRC is reported to have suppressed the news of the virus and also attempted to downplay and under report deaths. There are reports of detentions, assaults, torture and disappearances of whistleblowers including activists, doctors, lawyers, students and businessmen who created and uploaded videos of overburdened hospitals and high number of deaths.
Some of these whistleblowers were:
 Li Wenliang, a Chinese medical doctor who worked at Wuhan Central Hospital and issued emergency warnings to other hospitals and doctors about the new disease. He was arrested and accused of "making false comments" that had "severely disturbed the social order".
 Fang Bin, a Chinese businessman, citizen journalist and whistleblower who broadcast images of Wuhan during the Coronavirus crisis. He has been missing since 9 February 2020.
 Chen Qiushi, a Chinese lawyer, activist, and citizen journalist who covered the 2019–20 Hong Kong protests and the COVID-19 pandemic and has been missing since 6 February 2020.
 Li Zehua, a Chinese citizen journalist, rapper and YouTuber who was trying to trace missing lawyer and citizen journalist Chen Qiushi. He has been missing since 26 February 2020.
 Chen Mei and El amogid Wei, activists who were sharing censored articles about the coronavirus outbreak on an online archive, have been noncontactable since 19 April 2020
 Dr. Li-Meng Yan, a Hong Kong virologist and whistleblower had to escape to the US, after she found large scale cover ups of the pandemic by Chinese authorities. She said that if she told her story of the coverup in China, she "will be disappeared and killed."
 Independent journalist Zhang Zhan was served a four-year prison sentence for "picking quarrels and provoking troubles," a charge she received after she flew to Wuhan following the COVID-19 outbreak. At the time, she knew she was risking her own safety and arrest, but she wanted to learn more about the COVID-19 situation and share her findings with others.

Freedom of the press

Critics argue that the CCP has failed to live up to its promises about the freedom of the mainland Chinese media. Freedom House consistently ranks China as 'Not Free' in its annual press freedom survey, including the 2014 report. PRC journalist He Qinglian says that the PRC's media are controlled by directives from the Communist Party's propaganda department, and are subjected to intense monitoring which threatens punishment for violators, rather than to pre-publication censorship. In 2008, ITV News reporter John Ray was arrested while covering a 'Free Tibet' protest. International media coverage of Tibetan protests only a few months before the Beijing Olympics in 2008 triggered a strong reaction inside China. Chinese media practitioners took the opportunity to argue with propaganda authorities for more media freedom: one journalist asked, 'If not even Chinese journalists are allowed to report about the problems in Tibet, how can foreign journalists know about the Chinese perspective about the events?' Foreign journalists also reported that their access to certain websites, including those of human rights organizations, was restricted. International Olympic Committee president Jacques Rogge stated at the end of the 2008 Olympic Games that 'The regulations [governing foreign media freedom during the Olympics] might not be perfect but they are a sea-change compared to the situation before. We hope that they will continue.' The Foreign Correspondents Club of China (FCCC) issued a statement during the Olympics that 'despite welcome progress in terms of accessibility and the number of press conferences within the Olympic facilities, the FCCC has been alarmed at the use of violence, intimidation and harassment outside. The club has confirmed more than 30 cases of reporting interference since the formal opening of the Olympic media center on 25 July, and is checking at least 20 other reported incidents.'

Since the Chinese state continues to exert a considerable amount of control over media, public support for domestic reporting has come as a surprise to many observers. Not much is known about the extent to which the Chinese citizenry believe the official statements of the CCP, nor about which media sources they perceive as credible and why. So far, research on the media in China has focused on the changing relationship between media outlets and the state during the reform era. Nor is much known about how China's changing media environment has affected the government's ability to persuade media audiences. Research on political trust reveals that exposure to the media correlates positively with support for the government in some instances, and negatively in others. The research has been cited as evidence that the Chinese public believes propaganda transmitted to them through the news media, but also that they disbelieve it. These contradictory results can be explained by realizing that ordinary citizens consider media sources to be credible to a greater or lesser degree, depending on the extent to which media outlets have undergone reform.

In 2012 the UN High Commissioner for Human Rights urged the Chinese government to lift restrictions on media access to the region and allow independent and impartial monitors to visit and assess conditions in Tibet. The Chinese government did not change its position.

In March 2020, China expelled employees of The New York Times, The Washington Post, and The Wall Street Journal in response to U.S. treatment of state-owned Chinese media as employees of the Chinese government, requiring approval similar to diplomatic employees.

China has periodically deported foreign journalists before. Ursula Gauthier, a journalist from France working for the media organization L'Obs, was sent back to France after she commented on China's response to the Paris attacks that happened in November 2015. She noted that China's sympathetic stance wasn't "without ulterior motives."

Gauthier had previously reported on China's treatment of the Uyghur ethnic group, many of whom believe in Islam. China often accuses Uyghur people of terrorism and has set up a system of camps, which they claim are "vocational training centers." However, those who have lived through the camps allege that the authorities torture, rape, and sexually abuse the prisoners as well as force them into unpaid labor and sterilize the women. Moreover, many experts and foreign policymakers consider the detentions arbitrary rather than linked to provable terrorist charges. As such, journalists such as Gauthier have been critical of China's actions.

At the time of Gauthier's expulsion, she was the first journalist to be deported since China expelled Melissa Chan from Al Jazeera in 2015. Chan had reported on China's "black jails" and government land confiscation. Of her deportation, China Global Television Network's Yang Rui wrote, "We should shut up those who demonize China and send them packing," according to The Wall Street Journal.

Information hyper-control

The 2020 World Press Freedom Index, compiled by Reporters Without Borders (RSF), shows that China is the world's biggest jailer of journalists. Mainland China, which is trying to establish a “new world media order,” maintains its system of information hyper-control, of which the negative effects for the entire world have been seen during the coronavirus public health crisis. It states that the PRC never stops enhancing its system of information hyper-control and persecution of dissident journalists and bloggers, and that further evidence of this came in February 2020, when it arrested two of its citizens for taking it upon themselves to cover the coronavirus crisis. The world's biggest jailer of journalists, China is currently holding around 100, of whom the vast majority are Uyghurs.

On 29 May 2022, the U.S. expressed concern over China's "efforts to restrict and manipulate" the UN human rights chief's visit to the Xinjiang region. The conditions imposed by the Beijing authorities on Michelle Bachelet’s visit, did not enable a complete and independent assessment of the human rights environment in China.

Freedom of the Internet

More than sixty Internet regulations exist in mainland China and serve to monitor and control internet publication. These policies are implemented by provincial branches of state-owned Internet service providers, companies, and organizations. The apparatus of the PRC's and/or CCP's Internet control is considered more extensive and more advanced than in any other country in the world. The Golden Shield includes the ability to monitor online chatting services and mail, identifying IPs and all of the person's previous communication, and then being able to lock in on the person's location—because a person will usually use the computer at home or at work – which enables the arrest to be carried out. Amnesty International notes that China "has the largest recorded number of imprisoned journalists and cyber-dissidents in the world" and Paris-based Reporters Without Borders stated in 2010 and 2012 that "China is the world's biggest prison for netizens."

As an example of the censorship, in 2013, 24 years after the 1989 Tiananmen Square protests and massacre, online searches for the term 'Tiananmen Square' were still censored by Chinese authorities. According to the Amnesty International report the controls on the Internet, mass media and academia were significantly strengthened. For instance, Google, YouTube, Facebook and Wikipedia are banned in mainland China.   Repression of religious activities outside of direct state control increased.

Hukou system

The CCP came to power in the late 1940s and instituted a command economy. In 1958, Mao Zedong, the Chairman of the Chinese Communist Party, adopted a residency permit system defining where people could work, and classified workers as rural or urban. In this system, a worker who was seeking to move from the country to an urban area in order to take up non-agricultural work would have to apply for permission to do so through the relevant bureaucratic institutions. There is uncertainty, however, as to how strictly the system has been enforced. People who worked outside the region in which they were registered would not qualify for grain rations, employer-provided housing, or health care. There were controls over education, employment, marriage and other areas of life. One reason which was cited for the instituting of this system was the desire to prevent the possible chaos which would be caused by predictable large-scale urbanization. As a part of the one country, two systems policy which was proposed by Deng Xiaoping and accepted by the British and Portuguese governments, the special administrative regions (SARs) of Hong Kong and Macau retained separate border control and immigration policies with the rest of the PRC. Chinese nationals had to gain permission from the government before they were allowed to travel to Hong Kong or Macau, but this requirement was officially abolished for each SAR after its respective handover. Since then, restrictions which have been imposed by the SAR governments have been the main factors which limit travel.

In 2000 The Washington Times reported that although migrant labourers play a major role in spreading wealth in Chinese villages, they are treated 'like second-class citizens by a system which is so discriminatory that it has been likened to apartheid.' Anita Chan also posits that the People's Republic of China's household registration and temporary residence permit system has created a situation which is analogous to the passbook system that was implemented in South Africa in order to control the supply and actions of cheap labourers from underprivileged ethnic groups, as well as to control the quality and quantity of such labourers. In 2000, the Tibetan Centre for Human Rights and Democracy alleged that people of Han descent in Tibet have a far easier time acquiring the necessary permits to live in urban areas than ethnic Tibetans do.

Abolition of this policy has been proposed in 11 provinces, mainly along the developed eastern coast. After a widely publicized incident in 2003, when a university-educated migrant died in Guangdong province, the law was changed in order to eliminate the possibility of summary arrest for migrant labourers. The Beijing law lecturer who exposed the incident said it spelt the end of the hukou system: he believed that in most smaller cities, the system had been abandoned, and it had 'almost lost its function' in big cities like Beijing and Shanghai.

Treatment of rural workers
In November 2005, Jiang Wenran, acting director of the China Institute at the University of Alberta, said that the hukou system was one of the most strictly enforced apartheid structures in modern world history. He stated, 'Urban dwellers enjoy a range of social, economic and cultural benefits while peasants, the majority of the Chinese population, are treated like second-class citizens.'

The discrimination which was enforced by the hukou system became particularly onerous in the 1980s after hundreds of millions of migrant workers were forced out of state corporations, co-operatives and other institutions. Attempts to move to urban centers by workers who were classified as rural workers were tightly controlled by the Chinese bureaucracy, which enforced its control  by denying them access to essential goods and services such as grain rations, housing, and health care, and regularly closing down migrant workers' private schools. The hukou system also enforced pass laws which have been compared to those which existed in apartheid South Africa. Rural workers who wanted to work in provinces other than their own were required to possess six passes, and the police periodically conducted raids in which they rounded up those workers who were without permits, placed them in detention centers for a short period of time, and then deported them. It is also found that rural workers have been paid under minimum wage to nothing at all. A group of coal miners in Shuangyashan were being paid little to nothing. With the families and people whom they had to care for, each and every one of the workers protested for the money that they deserved. As in South Africa, the restrictions placed on the mobility of migrant workers were pervasive, and transient workers were forced to live a precarious existence in company dormitories or shanty towns, suffering abusive consequences. Anita Chan comments further that China's household registration and temporary residence permit system has created a situation analogous to the passbook system in apartheid South Africa, which were designed to regulate the supply of cheap labor.

The Chinese Ministry of Public Security has justified these practices on the grounds that they have assisted the police in tracking down criminals and maintaining public order, and they have also provided demographic data for government planning and programs.

Freedom of association

The People's Republic of China does not allow freedom of association in general; in particular, it does not allow a free choice of membership with trade unions and political parties. Under the Universal Declaration of Human Rights (UDHR), articles 20 and 23, every worker has the right to join an association of their choosing, to have their interests represented against their employer, and to take collective action including the right to strike. In China, on a model similar to the Deutsche Arbeitsfront from 1934 to 1945 in Germany, the All-China Federation of Trade Unions has a monopoly on union activity: it is effectively a nationalized organization. This dynamic violates International Labour Organization Conventions Number 87 and 98 on freedom of association and collective bargaining. The leadership of the ACFTU is not freely elected by its members, and it is not independent from the state or employers.

The CCP effectively monopolizes organized political activity in China. There is, therefore, no possibility of genuine electoral competition at any level of government, nor within the Party itself. This violates the UDHR article 21(1), which states, 'Everyone has the right to take part in the government of his country, directly or through freely chosen representatives.'

Religious freedom

During the Cultural Revolution (1966–1976), particularly during the Destruction of the Four Olds campaign, religious affairs of all types were persecuted, renunciated and strongly discouraged by Chairman Mao Zedong's government and its ideological allies. Many religious buildings were looted or destroyed. Since then, there have been efforts to repair, reconstruct and protect historical and cultural religious sites. In its International Religious Freedom Report for 2013, the US Department of State criticized the PRC as follows:
The government’s respect for and protection of the right to religious freedom fell well short of its international human rights commitments. (...) The government harassed, detained, arrested, or sentenced to prison a number of religious adherents for activities reported to be related to their religious beliefs and practices. These activities included assembling for religious worship, expressing religious beliefs in public and in private, and publishing religious texts. There were also reports of physical abuse and torture in detention.

The 1982 Constitution provides its citizens the right to believe in any religion, as well as the right to refrain from doing so:
Citizens of the People's Republic of China enjoy freedom of religious belief. No state organization, public organization or individual may compel citizens to believe in, or not to believe in, any religion; nor may they discriminate against citizens who believe in, or do not believe in, any religion. The state protects normal religious activities. No one may make use of religion to engage in activities that disrupt public order, impair the health of citizens or interfere with the educational system of the state. Religious bodies and religious affairs are not subject to any foreign domination.

Members of the Communist Party are officially required to be atheists, but this rule is not regularly enforced and many party members privately engage in religious activities. Global studies from Pew Research Center in 2014 and 2017 ranked the Chinese government's restrictions on religion as among the highest in the world, despite low to moderate rankings for religious-related social hostilities in the country.

Christianity

The Chinese government tries to maintain tight control over all organized religion, including Christianity. The only legal Christian groups are the Three-Self Patriotic Movement and the Chinese Patriotic Catholic Association, the latter of which has been condemned by the Pope. Both of these groups are under the control of the CCP. The members of the illegal, underground Catholic church and members of Protestant house churches face prosecution from PRC authorities.

In 2007, the Chinese Patriotic Catholic Association elected a Catholic bishop of Beijing to replace the deceased Fu Tieshan. The standard Catholic practice is for a bishop to be appointed by the Pope; the Catholic Church does not recognize the legitimacy of bishops elected by the Association, but not appointed by the Pope. According to Pope Benedict XVI, the Catholic Church in particular is viewed in China as a foreign power. Its situation is somewhat analogous to that of the Catholic Church in Post-Reformation England, in which the official church was also controlled by the state.

In early January 2018, Chinese authorities in Shanxi province demolished a church, which created a wave of fear among the Christians. In reports of countries with the strongest anti-Christian persecution, China was ranked by the Open Doors organization in 2019 as the 27th most severe country and in 2020 as 23rd most severe.

Tibetan Buddhism 
The Dalai Lama is a highly influential figure in Tibetan Buddhism, who has traditionally lived in Tibet. Because of Chinese governmental control over the Tibetan area, the current Dalai Lama resides in Dharamshala, Himachal Pradesh, in the Republic of India. In a regulation promulgated 3 August 2007, the Chinese government declared that after 1 September 2007, "[no] living Buddha [may be reincarnated] without government approval, since the Qing dynasty, when the live Buddha system was established." The PRC Government-appointed Panchen Lama is labelled a fake by those who regard the PRC's effort to control organized religion as contradictory to the Universal Declaration of Human Rights and other ethical principles.

Examples of the political controls exercised over religion in 1998 include:
 quotas on the number of monks to reduce the spiritual population
 forced denunciation of the Dalai Lama as a spiritual leader
 the expulsion of unapproved monks from monasteries
 forced recitation of patriotic scripts supporting China
 restriction of religious study before age 18

Monks celebrating the reception of the US Congressional Gold Medal by the Dalai Lama have been detained by the PRC. In November 2012 the United Nations Human Rights Commissioner urged the PRC to address the allegations of rights violations in Tibet; the violations had led to an alarming escalation of 'desperate' forms of protest in the region, including self-immolations. Amnesty International report reports that  Xinjiang Uighur Autonomous Region and in Tibetan-populated areas.

Uyghurs 
Article 36 of the PRC Constitution provides constitutional protection for citizens’ freedom of religion and the country's official ethnic policies also reiterate protection of the freedom of religion of ethnic minorities, but in practice the Uyghur population, predominantly living in the Xinjiang Uyghur Autonomous Region, are subject to strict controls on the practice of Islam.

Examples of these restrictions now include:
Official religious practices must be held in government-approved mosques
Uyghurs under 18 years old are not allowed to enter mosques or pray in school
The study of religious texts is only permitted in designated state schools
Government informers regularly attend religious gatherings in mosques
Women are not allowed to wear headscarves and veils and men are not allowed to have beards
The use of traditionally Islamic names (e.g., Abdul), is banned

Since the September 11 attacks in 2001, the Chinese government began to label violence in the Xinjiang Uyghur Autonomous Region as terrorism, unlike in previous years. Chinese counter-terror legislation now makes explicit links between religion and extremism and has led to regulations that explicitly ban religious expression among Uyghurs in particular.

Since Communist Party General Secretary Xi Jinping came to power in 2012, reports have surfaced that around a million Muslims (Chinese citizens and some Central Asian nationals) were detained in internment camps throughout Xinjiang without trial or access to a lawyer. In these camps they were 're-educated' to disavow their Islamic beliefs and habitats while praising the Communist Party. The camps have expanded rapidly, with almost no judicial process or legal paperwork. Chinese officials are quoted in state media as saying that these measures are to fight separatism and Islamic extremism.

Since 2017, the Chinese government has pursued a policy which has led to more than one million Muslims (the majority of them Uyghurs) being held in secretive detention camps without any legal process. Critics of the policy have described it as the sinicization of Xinjiang and called it an ethnocide or cultural genocide, with many activists, NGOs, human rights experts, government officials, and the U.S. government calling it a genocide.

New bans and regulations were implemented on 1 April 2017. Abnormally long beards and wearing veils in public were both banned. Not watching state-run television or listening to radio broadcasts, refusing to abide by family planning policies, or refusing to allow one's children to attend state-run schools were all prohibited. Giving a child a name that would "exaggerate religious fervor," such as Muhammad, was made illegal. Along with this, many mosques were demolished or destroyed.

According to Radio Free Asia, the Chinese government jailed Uyghur Imam Abduheber Ahmet after he took his son to a religious school not sanctioned by the Chinese state. Ahmet had previously been lauded by China as a "five-star" imam but was sentenced in 2018 to over five years in prison for his action.

Also in 2018, over one million Chinese government workers began forcibly living in the homes of Uyghur families to monitor and assess resistance to assimilation, and to watch for frowned-upon religious or cultural practices. These government workers were trained to call themselves "relatives" and have been described in Chinese state media as being a key part of enhancing "ethnic unity".

In addition, records of the government indicate that thousands of Uighur children have been separated from their parents. New evidence shows that over 9,500 children in Yarkand county had at least one parent detained – most of them are Uighur children. According to the researcher Adrian Zenz, in 2019, the number of children living in boarding facilities increased by 76%, reaching a total of 880,500 children.

In March 2020, the Chinese government was found to be using the Uyghur minority for forced labor, inside sweat shops. According to a report published then by the Australian Strategic Policy Institute (ASPI), no fewer than around 80,000 Uyghurs were forcibly removed from the region of Xinjiang and used for forced labor in at least twenty-seven corporate factories. According to the Business and Human Rights resource center, corporations such as Abercrombie & Fitch, Adidas, Amazon, Apple, BMW, Fila, Gap, H&M, Inditex, Marks & Spencer, Nike, North Face, Puma, PVH, Samsung, and UNIQLO each have each sourced from these factories prior to the publication of the ASPI report.

On 19 July 2020, British Foreign Secretary Dominic Raab accused the PRC of "gross and egregious" human rights abuses against its Uyghur population. He added that while Britain wanted good relations with China, it could not stand by the reports of forced sterilization and mass education camps targeting the Uyghur population in Xinjiang. It is believed that up to a million Uyghur people have been detained over the past few years in what the Chinese state defines as "re-education camps".

On 24 July 2020, two Members of the European Parliament, Hilde Vautmans and Katalin Cseh, wrote a letter to Josep Borrell Fontelles, the vice-president of the European Commission, urging him to punish mainland China for violating the human rights of its Uyghur population and Hong Kong citizens. They also stated to enact EU Magnitsky Act in order to sanction the leaders who committed these human rights violations.

On 28 July 2020, a report documented that the US government and several activist groups mounted pressure on global businesses to reexamine and cut ties with China's Xinjiang region, where allegations of human rights violations have run rampant for years. The Uyghurs and other Muslim minority groups in the region have been imprisoned in internment camps and are forced to work. On 31 August 2020, human rights campaigners requested the US authorities to ban all imports of cotton from the Chinese province of Xinjiang, due to allegations of widespread forced labour. The documents cited substantial evidence that the Uighur community and other minority groups in China were being press-ganged into working in the region's cotton fields.

On 10 October 2020, the UK shadow foreign secretary, Lisa Nandy urged Britain to block China’s seat on the United Nations Human Rights Council over the country’s treatment of Uyghur Muslims.

On 19 January 2021, outgoing Secretary of State Mike Pompeo formally declared that China is committing a genocide against the Uighurs and crimes against humanity. In a written letter, Pompeo wrote, “I believe this genocide is ongoing, and that we are witnessing the systematic attempt to destroy Uyghurs by the Chinese party-state.” Pompeo called for “all appropriate multilateral and relevant juridical bodies, to join the United States in our effort to promote accountability for those responsible for these atrocities." China strongly denies that human rights abuses are going on in Xinjiang. Pompeo has previously stated that China is trying to "erase its own citizens."

In 2021, independent sources reported that Uyghur women in China's internment camps have been systematically raped, sexually abused and tortured. Victims said there is a system of organized rape. The Chinese police also electrocute and torture them. There is planned dehumanization, sterilization and torture.

On 16 August 2021, a young Chinese woman, named Wu Huan, told the Associated Press in her testimony that she was allegedly held for eight days at a Chinese-run secret detention facility in the United Arab Emirates, along with two other Uyghurs. Wu Huan said she was abducted from a hotel in Dubai and detained by Chinese officials at a villa converted into a jail. It was the first evidence that China was operating a “black site” beyond its borders.

On 31 August 2022, the UN Human Rights Office issued an assessment of human rights concerns in Xinjiang Uyghur Autonomous Region. The report published in the wake of the visit by UN High Commissioner of Human Rights, Michelle Bachelet, stated that “allegations of patterns of torture, or ill-treatment, including forced medical treatment and adverse conditions of detention, are credible, as are allegations of individual incidents of sexual and gender-based violence.”

Falun Gong

Following a period of meteoric growth of Falun Gong in the 1990s, the Communist Party led by General Secretary Jiang Zemin banned Falun Gong on 20 July 1999. An extra-constitutional body called the 6-10 Office was created to lead the suppression of Falun Gong. The authorities mobilized the state media apparatus, judiciary, police, army, the education system, families and workplaces against the group. The campaign is driven by large-scale propaganda through television, newspaper, radio and internet. There are reports of systematic torture, illegal imprisonment, forced labour, organ harvesting and abusive psychiatric measures, with the apparent aim of forcing practitioners to recant their belief in Falun Gong.

Foreign observers estimate that hundreds of thousands and perhaps millions of Falun Gong practitioners have been detained in "re-education through labor" camps, prisons and other detention facilities for refusing to renounce the spiritual practice. Former prisoners have reported that Falun Gong practitioners consistently received "the longest sentences and worst treatment" in labour camps, and in some facilities Falun Gong practitioners formed the substantial majority of detainees. As of 2009 at least 2,000 Falun Gong adherents had been tortured to death in the persecution campaign, with some observers putting the number much higher.

Some international observers and judicial authorities have described the campaign against Falun Gong as a genocide. In 2009, courts in Spain and Argentina indicted senior Chinese officials for genocide and crimes against humanity for their role in orchestrating the suppression of Falun Gong.

Organ harvesting

In 2006 allegations emerged that the vital organs of non-consenting Falun Gong practitioners had been used to supply China's organ tourism industry. In 2008, two United Nations Special Rapporteurs reiterated their requests for "the Chinese government to fully explain the allegation of taking vital organs from Falun Gong practitioners and the source of organs for the sudden increase in organ transplants that has been going on in China since the year 2000".

Matas and Kilgour, and Gutmann have, between them, published three books alleging organ harvesting in China. The Kilgour-Matas report stated, "the source of 41,500 transplants for the six-year period 2000 to 2005 is unexplained" and "we believe that there has been and continues today to be large scale organ seizures from unwilling Falun Gong practitioners". Ethan Gutmann, who interviewed over 100 individuals as witnesses, estimated that 65,000 Falun Gong prisoners were killed for their organs from 2000 to 2008.

Political freedom
The People's Republic of China is a signatory to the International Covenant on Civil and Political Rights, but has not ratified it. Legally, all citizens of the People's Republic of China who have reached the age of 18 have the right to vote and stand for election, regardless of ethnicity, race, sex, occupation, family background, religious belief, education, property status, or length of residence, except for persons deprived of political rights according to laws imposed by the CCP's Constitution.

In Mao's China, the CCP openly repressed all opposing political groups. This behaviour is now reflected in the judicial system, and has evolved into the selective repression of small groups of people who overtly challenge the CCP's power or its people's democratic dictatorship. The most recent major movement advocating for political freedom was obliterated through the Tiananmen Square Massacre in 1989, the estimated death toll of which ranges from about 200 to 10,000 depending on sources. In November 1992, 192 Chinese political activists and democracy advocates submitted a petition to the 16th National Congress of the Chinese Communist Party to introduce political reforms. One of the six demands was the ratification of the Covenant. As a reaction to the petition, the Chinese authorities arrested Zhao Changqing, proponent of the petition, and are still holding a number of activists for attempted subversion.

One of the most famous dissidents is Zhang Zhixin, who is known for standing up against the ultra-left.

In October 2008, the government denounced the European Parliament's decision to award the Sakharov Prize for Freedom of Thought to political prisoner Hu Jia, maintaining that it was 'gross interference in China's domestic affairs' to give such an award to a 'jailed criminal.. in disregard of [the Chinese government's] repeated representations.'

Although the Chinese government does not violate its people's privacy as much or as overtly as it used to, it still deems it necessary to keep track of what people say in public. Internet forums are strictly monitored, as are international postal mail (which sometimes is inexplicably delayed, or simply disappears) and e-mail.

Local officials are chosen by election, and even though non-Communist Party candidates are allowed to stand, those with dissident views can face arbitrary exclusion from the ballot, interference with campaigning, and even detention.

Freedom House rates China as a 6 (the second lowest possible rank) in political freedoms. In 2011, the organization said of the Chinese political leadership:

With a sensitive change of leadership approaching in 2012 and popular uprisings against authoritarian regimes occurring across the Middle East, the ruling Chinese Communist Party showed no signs of loosening its grip on power in 2011. Despite minor legal improvements regarding the death penalty and urban property confiscation, the government stalled or even reversed previous reforms related to the rule of law, while security forces resorted to extralegal forms of repression. Growing public frustration over corruption and injustice fueled tens of thousands of protests and several large outbursts of online criticism during the year. The party responded by committing more resources to internal security forces and intelligence agencies, engaging in the systematic enforced disappearance of dozens of human rights lawyers and bloggers, and enhancing controls over online social media.Jiang Tianyong is the latest lawyer known for defending jailed critics of the government. In the 709 crackdown which began in 2015, more than 200 lawyers, legal assistants, and activists, including Jiang, were arrested and/or detained.

Independence movements

The independence movements in China are mainly contained within the Inner Mongolian Regions, the Tibetan region, and the Xinjiang region. These regions contain people from ethnic and religious minority groups such as the Mongols, the Tibetans and the Uyghurs.

The Chinese government has had strained relations with these regions since the early 1910s, when the first president of the Chinese Republic, Sun Yat-sen, suggested a plan to move a large number of Han people from Southeast China to Northwest China in an effort to assimilate the ethnic minorities that lived in the area. While Sun Yat-sen lost political power before he could enforce this plan, his sinocentric, assimilationist attitude was adopted by future leader Chiang Kai-shek. Chiang Kai-shek enacted educational policy that encouraged cultural assimilation and discouraged self-determinism until 1945, when Chiang Kai-shek and his Nationalist party became more lenient towards the various ethnic minorities. From this time until the establishment of the People's Republic of China under Mao Zedong, ethnic minorities experienced great independence from the Chinese government, with Mongolia becoming an independent state in 1921 and Xinjiang being named an autonomous region in 1955.

Tibetan, Mongolian, and Xinjiang independence was severely restricted by the Communist Party in the 1950s under Mao Zedong, with the forced annexation of Inner Mongolia, Tibet, and Xinjiang back into mainland China, leading to many protests and riots from the ethnic and religious minorities in the autonomous regions. From this point onwards, there has been a sustained outpouring of secessionist and independence movements from China's autonomous regions.

Currently, the largest independence struggle is being waged by the Muslim-Turkic population of Xinjiang, which shares minimal cultural, lingual, and historical similarities with the Han population in China. While the Chinese government under Deng Xiaoping promised to grant some advantages to the population of Xinjiang such as practising affirmative action in universities, greater liberties with regard to China's one-child policy, and increased government subsidies in the region, the government also discourages and restricts the Muslim-Turkic ethnic population from freely practising its religion, expressing its faith by wearing head scarves, fasting, growing facial hair, and building mosques freely. Furthermore, because of the advantages which the Chinese government grants to the people of Xinjiang, many Han Chinese are prejudiced against them, and their prejudice against the Uyghurs is bolstered by the widespread belief that the government unfairly grants preferential treatment to ethnic minorities in general.

One noteworthy event is the Feb 1997 riots in Yining, a county which is located between Kazakhstan and Xinjiang, during which 12 independence movement leaders were executed and 27 others were arrested and incarcerated. Moreover, almost 200 Uyghurs were killed and over 2,000 more Uyghurs were arrested. In 2008 riots broke out within Tibetan regions such as Lhasa, and anti-Han "pogroms" were committed in Ürümqi, Xinjiang in July 2009. In response to these riots, the Chinese government has increased its police presence in these regions and it has also sought to control offshore reporting and intimidate foreign-based reporters by detaining their family members.

Political abuse of psychiatry
Political abuse of psychiatry began to be practised in mainland China during the 1950s, shortly after Mao Zedong established the People's Republic of China, and continues to be practised in different forms up to present day. Initially, under Mao Zedong, the practice of psychiatry in China saw legitimate improvements in the breadth and quality of treatments. However, as time passed under the direction of Mao Zedong and the campaign of ideological reform was implemented, psychiatric diagnoses became used as a way to control and incarcerate Chinese citizens who didn't subscribe to Maoist ideologies such as Marxism–Leninism. The main demographic of Chinese citizens being targeted and placed in mental asylums were academics, intellectuals, students, and religious groups for their capitalist tendencies and bourgeois worldview. The justification for placing those who didn't comply with Maoist principles in mental institutions was the belief that non-Maoist political ideologies such as capitalism caused extreme individualism and selfishness, which contributed to mental disabilities such as schizophrenia and paranoid psychosis.  Maoists justified their claim that anti-Communist beliefs caused mental imbalances by making a positive correlation between the wealth and class of a particular group of people and the number of "mentally ill" people within that group. 

Political abuse of psychiatry in mainland China peaked from the mid-1960s to the late 1970s. During this time, Chinese counterrevolutionists and political dissidents were placed into mental asylums, where they were treated with psychotherapy (xinli zhiliao) resembling political indoctrination sessions. During this time, statistics indicate that there were more political activists being held in mental institutions than the number of rapists, murderers, arsonists, and other violent mentally ill people combined. The human rights activist Wei Jingsheng was among the first to speak out about the misappropriation of psychiatry for political purposes in the winter of 1978; however, in response to his advocacy, he was imprisoned and subjected to involuntary drugging and beating by the Chinese government. 

After the end of the Cultural Revolution in the late 1970s, the abuse of psychiatry for political purposes  continually diminished until the 1990s, when there was a resurgence in politically motivated psychiatric diagnoses towards political dissidents and minority religious groups. During this more recent wave of Chinese forensic psychiatry, political dissidents and practicers of non-mainstream religions were sent to Ankang (meaning peace and health) hospitals. These hospitals, built to hold the criminally insane, are managed by Bureau No. 13 of China's Ministry of Public Security. Ankang hospitals have been the target of much scrutiny by human rights activists and organizations both inside and outside of China, and reports indicate inhumane treatment of patients inside these hospitals. Patients in these hospitals are forced to work at least 7 hours a day and are subjected to torture including acupuncture with electric currents, forced injection of drugs that are known to damage the central nervous system, and physical abuse with ropes and electric batons. Furthermore, reports by Chinese surgeons at these hospitals report on the use of psychosurgery on patients who were involuntarily placed in these hospitals to reduce "violent and impulsive behaviors". One of the most targeted groups of Chinese citizens to be placed in Ankang hospitals are the practicers of Falun Gong, who have what is termed "evil cult-induced mental disorder" or "xiejiao suo zhi jingshen zheng'ai" by Chinese psychiatry. Over 1000 practitioners have been incarcerated in mental asylums across 23 provinces, cities, and autonomous regions.

One of the most famous cases of politically motivated psychiatric diagnoses took place in 1992, when Wang Wanxing was arrested for displaying a pro-democracy banner in Tiananmen Square. After Wang's arrest, his wife signed a statement confirming his mental instability, because police told her that doing so would ensure Wang's immediate release. However, Wang was instead placed in the Beijing Ankang hospital. He was exiled to Germany in 2005.

The People's Republic of China is the only country which currently abuses psychiatry for political purposes in a systematic way, and despite international criticism, this abuse seems to be continuing as of 2010. Political abuse of psychiatry in the People's Republic of China is high on the agenda in the international psychiatric community, and has produced recurring disputes. The abuses there appear to be even more widespread than in the Soviet Union in the 1970s and 1980s and involve the incarceration of petitioners, human rights workers, trade union activists, followers of the Falun Gong movement, and people complaining against injustices by local authorities.

In August 2002, the General Assembly of the WPA was held during the WPA World Congress in Yokohama. The issue of Chinese political abuse of psychiatry was placed on the agenda of the General Assembly, and a decision was made to send an investigative mission to China. The visit was projected for the spring of 2003, in order to assure that a representative of the WPA could present a report during the Annual Meeting of the American Psychiatric Association in May 2003, as well as at the annual meeting of the British Royal College of Psychiatrists in June and July of that year. The 2003 investigative mission never took place, and when the WPA did organize a visit to China, it was more a scientific exchange. In the meantime, the political abuse of psychiatry persists unabated.

Political prisoners

The Chinese government has a history of imprisoning citizens for political reasons. Article 73 of China's Criminal Procedure Law was adopted in 2012 and allow the authorities to detain people for reasons of "state security" or "terrorism". In this regard, detainees can be held for as long as six months in “designated locations” such as secret prisons.

The number of political prisoners peaked during the Mao era and it has been decreasing ever since. From 1953 to 1975, around 26 to 39 per cent of prisoners were incarcerated for political reasons. By 1980, the percentage of prisoners incarcerated for political reasons was only 13 per cent, and this figure decreased to 0.5 per cent in 1989 and 0.46 per cent in 1997. 1997 is also the year that the Chinese Criminal Law was amended to replace counterrevolutionary crime with crimes endangering national security.

During the Mao era, one notorious labour camp called Xingkaihu which was located in the northeastern Heilongjiang Province was operated from 1955 to 1969. During this time, over 20,000 inmates were forced to work on irrigation, infrastructure construction, and agricultural projects for the government while being subjected to ideological reform; a significant percentage of these inmates were incarcerated for being counterrevolutionaries and political dissidents. The conditions in Xingkaihu were so poor that many inmates eventually died due to malnutrition and disease.

More recently, since the spring of 2008, the Chinese government has detained 831 Tibetans as political prisoners; of these 831 prisoners, 12 are serving life sentences and 9 were sentenced to death.

In 2009 Nobel Laureate Liu Xiaobo was imprisoned for advocating democratic reforms and increased freedom of speech in Charter 08. In 2017 he died in prison from late stage liver cancer at the age of 61.

Other political prisoners include journalist Tan Zuoren, human rights activist Xu Zhiyong, and journalist Shi Tao. Tan Zuoren was arrested in 2010 and sentenced to 5 years in prison after publicly speaking about government corruption as well as the poorly constructed school buildings that collapsed and led to the deaths of thousands of children during the 2008 earthquake in Sichuan. Xu Zhiyong was sentenced to four years in prison in 2014 after gaining a significant social media following and using it as a platform to express his sociopolitical opinions. Shi Tao was sentenced to 8 years after publicizing the list of instructions that the Communist Party sent journalists regarding how to report the 15th anniversary of the Tiananmen Square Massacre.

On 30 June 2020, Sun Qia, a Chinese-born woman who immigrated to Canada and was a Falun Gong practitioner, was sentenced to eight years in jail for belonging to a spiritual movement that Beijing calls a “cult.” Ms. Sun told a lawyer that she was mentally tortured in the prison and pepper-sprayed while restrained.

Cheng Lei, an Australian TV host working at China's state broadcaster, was detained by the Chinese authorities. On 14 August 2020, the Australian Government received a "formal notification" of her detention. Australia's minister for foreign affairs, Marise Payne, said that Lei had been detained without any charges and could be held for months. The arrest came as tensions between both the countries grew over investigation of the COVID-19 pandemic in Beijing followed by trade suspension to Australia.

Pro-democracy movements
Some people have campaigned against the one-party Communist rule in Mainland China over the years.

Freedom of assembly and association 

The freedom of assembly is provided by the Article 35 of the Chinese Constitution. The Article 51, however, restricts its exercise: such right «may not infringe upon the interests of the state».

Human rights activists such as Xie Xang fight for the rights of Chinese people by protesting, slandering the governments' names on social media, and by filing lawsuits. Xang has commented on the punishment he received for protesting, claiming that he was interrogated while shackled onto a metal chair, forced to sit in stressful positions for a set amount of time, and tortured physically and mentally. He also quoted his interrogators stating that he was told that "I could torture you to death and no one could help you."

Freedom of movement, Privacy 

In 2010 in response to Chunyun (increase in traffic movements due to Chinese New Year), which has caused various problems with tickets prices (due to resale by speculative traders), a system similar to blogs-related real-name identification system was introduced on nine railroad stations. It requires the transport companies to demand far-travelers to provide a real name for their tickets. Several critics and media have raised concerns about its possible privacy violations and freedom of movement rights restrictions risks.

One-child policy (1979-2015)

The Chinese government's birth control policy, known widely as the one-child policy, was implemented in 1979 by chairman Deng Xiaoping's government to alleviate the overpopulation problem. Having more than one child was illegal and punishable by fines. This policy  was replaced with a two-child policy in 2015. In May 2021, the policy was further relaxed to a three child policy, and all restrictions were removed in July 2021.

In 2005, Voice of America cited critics who argued that the one-child policy contributed to forced abortions, human rights violations, female infanticide, abandonment and sex-selective abortions, which are believed to be relatively commonplace in some areas of the country. Sex-selective abortions are thought to have been a significant contribution to the gender imbalance in mainland China, where there is a 118:100 ratio of male to female children reported. Forced abortions and sterilizations have also been reported.

Capital punishment

According to Amnesty International, throughout the 1990s more people were executed or sentenced to death in China than in the rest of the world put together.

Officially, the death penalty in mainland China is only administered to offenders who commit serious and violent crimes, such as aggravated murder, but China retains in law a number of nonviolent death penalty offences such as drug trafficking. The People's Republic of China administers more official death penalties than any other country, though other countries (such as Iran and Singapore) have higher official execution rates. Reliable NGOs such as Amnesty International and Human Rights in China have informed the public that the total execution numbers, with unofficial death penalties included, greatly exceed officially recorded executions; in 2009, the Dui Hua Foundation estimated that 5,000 people were executed in China – far more than all other nations combined. The precise number of executions is regarded as a state secret.

PRC authorities have recently been pursuing measures to reduce the official number of crimes punishable by death and limit how much they officially utilize the death penalty. In 2011, the National People's Congress Standing Committee adopted an amendment to reduce the number of capital crimes from 68 to 55. Later the same year, the Supreme People's Court ordered lower courts to suspend death sentences for two years and to 'ensure that it only applies to a very small minority of criminals committing extremely serious crimes.'

The death penalty is one of the classical Five Punishments of the Chinese Dynasties. In Chinese philosophy, the death penalty was supported by the Legalists, but its application was tempered by the Confucianists, who preferred rehabilitation over punishment of any sort, including capital punishment. In Communist philosophy, Vladimir Lenin urged the retention of the death penalty, whilst Karl Marx and Friedrich Engels claimed that the practice was feudal and a symbol of capitalist oppression. Chairman Mao of the CCP and his government retained the death penalty's place in the legal system, whilst advocating that it be used for a limited number of counterrevolutionaries. The market reformer Deng Xiaoping after him stressed that the practice must not be abolished, and advocated its wider use against recidivists and corrupt officials. Leaders of the PRC's minor, non-communist parties have also advocated for greater use of the death penalty. Both Deng and Mao viewed the death penalty as having tremendous popular support, and portrayed the practice as a means to 'assuage the people's anger'.

The death penalty has widespread support in mainland China, especially for violent crimes, and no group in government or civil society vocally advocates for its abolition. Surveys conducted by the Chinese Academy of Social Sciences in 1995, for instance, found that 95 per cent of the Chinese population supported the death penalty, and these results were mirrored in other studies. Polling conducted in 2007 in Beijing, Hunan and Guangdong found a more moderate 58 per cent in favour of the death penalty, and further found that a majority (63.8 per cent) believed that the government should release execution statistics to the public.

A total of 46 crimes are punishable by death, including some non-violent, white-collar crimes such as embezzlement and tax fraud. Execution methods include lethal injections and shooting. The People's Armed Police carries out the executions, usually at 10:00 am.

Death sentences in post-Maoist mainland China can be politically or socially influenced. In 2003, a local court sentenced the leader of a triad society to a death sentence with two years of probation. However, the public opinion was that the sentence was too light. Under public pressure, the supreme court of Communist China took the case and retried the leader, resulting in a death sentence, which was carried out immediately.

Execution protocol

The execution protocol is defined in criminal procedure law, under article 212:

Before a people's court executes a death sentence, it shall notify the people's procuratorate at the same level to send personnel to supervise the execution.
Death sentences shall be executed by means of shooting or injection.
Death sentences may be executed at the execution ground or in designated places of custody.
The judicial personnel directing the execution shall verify the identity of the criminal offender, ask him if he has any last words or letters, and then deliver him to the executioner for the death sentence. If, before the execution, it is found that there may be an error, the execution shall be suspended and the matter shall be reported to the Supreme People's Court for decision.
Execution of death sentences shall be announced to the public, but shall not be held in public.
The attending court clerk shall, after an execution, make a written record thereon. The people's court that caused the death sentence to be executed shall submit a report on the execution to the Supreme People's Court.
The people's court that caused the death sentence to be executed shall, after the execution, notify the family of the criminal offender.

In some areas of mainland China, there is no specific execution ground. A scout team chooses a place in advance to serve as the execution ground. In such a case, the execution ground normally will have three perimeters: the innermost 50meters is the responsibility of the execution team; the 200-meter radius from the center is the responsibility of the People's Armed Police; and the 2-kilometer alert line is the responsibility of the local police. The public is generally not allowed to view the execution.

The role of the executioner was fulfilled in the past by the People's Armed Police. In recent times, the legal police force assumed this role.

Since 1949, the most common method of execution has been execution by firing squad. This method has been largely superseded by lethal injection, using the same three-drug cocktail pioneered by the United States, introduced in 1996. Execution vans are unique to mainland China, however. Lethal injection is more commonly used for 'economic crimes' such as corruption, while firing squads are used for more common crimes like murder. In 2010, Chinese authorities moved to have lethal injection become the dominant form of execution; in some provinces and municipalities, it is now the only legal form of capital punishment. The Dui Hua foundation notes that it is impossible to ascertain whether these guidelines are closely followed, as the method of execution is rarely specified in published reports.

Criticism

Human rights groups and foreign governments have heavily criticized the PRC's use of the death penalty for a variety of reasons, including its application for non-violent offences, allegations of the use of torture to extract confessions, legal proceedings that do not meet international standards, and the government's failure to publish statistics on the death penalty. However, as acknowledged by both the Chinese Supreme Court and the United States Department of State, the vast majority of death sentences are given for violent, nonpolitical crimes which would be considered serious in other countries.

The Coalition to Investigate the Persecution of Falun Gong has accused Chinese hospitals of using the organs of executed prisoners for commercial transplantation. Under Chinese law, condemned prisoners must give written consent to become organ donors, but because of this and other legal restrictions on organ donation, an international black market in organs and cadavers from China has developed. In 2009, Chinese authorities acknowledged that two-thirds of organ transplants in the country could be traced back to executed prisoners and announced a crackdown on the practice.

United States

Running for president in 1992, Bill Clinton sharply criticized his predecessor George H. W. Bush for prioritizing profitable trade relationships over human rights issues in mainland China. As president, 1993–2001, however, Clinton backed away from his position. He did articulate a desired set of goals for mainland China. They included free emigration, no exportation of goods made with prison labour, release of peaceful protesters, treatment of prisoners in terms of international standards, recognition of the distinct regional culture of Tibet, permitting international television and radio coverage, and observation of human rights specified by United Nations resolutions. China refused to comply, and by summer 1994 Clinton admitted defeat and called for a renewal of normalized trade relations. However congressional pressure, especially from Republicans, forced Clinton to approve arms sales to Taiwan, despite the strong displeasure voiced by Beijing. In 2020, president Donald Trump praised China's use of the death penalty.

Wrongful executions
An estimate of over 1000 people are executed every year in mainland China. Most of these executions are due to crimes that are seen as intolerable to the society within mainland China and the People's Republic of China. There are some cases that have been held wrongly.

At least four people have been considered wrongfully executed by PRC courts.

Wei Qing'an (circa 1951 1984) was a Chinese citizen who was executed for the rape of Liu, a woman who had disappeared. The execution was carried out on 3 May 1984 by the Intermediate People's Court. In the next month, Tian Yuxiu was arrested and admitted that he had committed the rape. Three years later, Wei was officially declared innocent.
Teng Xingshan (? 1989) was a Chinese citizen who was executed for having raped, robbed and murdered Shi Xiaorong, a woman who had disappeared. An old man found a dismembered body, and police forensics claimed to have matched the body to the photo of the missing Shi Xiaorong. The execution was carried out on 28 January 1989 by the Huaihua Intermediate People's Court. In 1993, the missing woman returned to the village, saying she had been kidnapped to Shandong. The absolute innocence of the executed Teng was not admitted until 2005.
Nie Shubin (1974 1995) was a Chinese citizen who was executed for the rape and murder of Kang Juhua, a woman in her thirties.  The execution was carried out on 27 April 1995 by the Shijiazhuang Intermediate People's Court. In 2005, ten years after the execution, Wang Shujin admitted to the police that he had committed the murder. Therefore, it has been indicated that Nie Shubin had been innocent all along.

Torture

Although the People's Republic of China outlawed torture in 1996, human rights groups say brutality and degradation are common in Chinese arbitrary detention centers, Laojiao prisons and black jails. People who are imprisoned for their political views, human rights activities or religious beliefs have a high risk of being tortured.  Strategies of torture inside black jail include deprivation of sleep, food, and medication. The strategies are all quite inhumane conditions. In a specific case, a woman named Huang Yan was imprisoned for her political views and included the deprivation of medication. She had diabetes and ovarian cancer which required her to take medication. Tests have shown that the ovarian cancer have spread throughout her body. While the existence of black jails is acknowledged by at least part of the government, the CCP strongly denies facilitating the operation of such jails and officially cracks down on them, leading to at least one trial.

In May 2010, the PRC authorities officially passed new regulations in an attempt to nullify evidence gathered through violence or intimidation in their official judicial procedures, and to reduce the level of torture administered to prisoners already in jails. Little is known, however, about whether or how procedures were modified in black jails, which are not officially part of the judicial system. The move came after a public outcry following the revelation that a farmer, convicted for murder based on his confession under torture, was in fact innocent. The case came to light only when his alleged victim was found alive, after the defendant had spent ten years in prison. International human rights groups gave the change a cautious welcome.

Torture is reportedly used as part of the indoctrination process at the Xinjiang internment camps. The torture is alleged to include waterboarding and sexual violence.

Ethnic minorities

There are 55 officially recognized native ethnic minorities in China. Article 4 of the Chinese constitution states 'All nationalities in the People's Republic of China are equal', and the government argues that it has made efforts to improve ethnic education and increased ethnic representation in local government. Some groups are still fighting for recognition as minorities. In the 1964 Census, there were 183 nationalities registered, of which the government recognized 54.

Some policies cause reverse racism, in which Han Chinese or even ethnic minorities from other regions are treated as second-class citizens in the ethnic region. Similarly, there are wide-ranging preferential policies (affirmative action programs) in place to promote social and economic development for ethnic minorities, including preferential employment, political appointments, and business loans. Universities typically have quotas reserved for ethnic minorities, even if they have lower admission test scores. Ethnic minorities are also more often exempt from the one-child policy, which targets the Han Chinese.

Stern punishments of independence-seeking demonstrators, rioters, or terrorists have led to mistreatment of the Tibetan and Uyghur minorities in Western China. The United States in 2007 refused to help repatriate five Chinese Uyghur Guantanamo Bay detainees because of 'past treatment of the Uigur minority'. In its 2007 annual report to the U.S. Congress, the Congressional-Executive Commission on China said the Chinese government "provides incentives for migration to the region from elsewhere in China." Xi Jinping, the General Secretary of the Chinese Communist Party (paramount leader), said in April 2014 that China faces increasing threats to national security and the government could impose tougher controls on its ethnic minorities due to terrorist attacks like the 2014 Kunming attack. In Xinjiang, the Ürümqi Motorized Vehicle Licensing and Testing Department has begun requiring all ethnic Uyghur and Kazakh individuals to undergo a background check before registering a vehicle.

In March 2019, the United States Department of State criticized mainland China for its human rights violations, saying the sort of abuses it had inflicted on its Muslim minorities had not been witnessed “since the 1930s”. The department's annual Country Reports on Human Rights Practices stated that the PRC was “in a league of its own when it comes to human rights violations”.

Forcible biometrics collection 
PRC authorities in western Xinjiang province are collecting DNA samples, fingerprints, eye scans and blood types of millions of people aged 12 to 65.  Sophie Richardson, Human Rights Watch's China director, said "the mandatory databanking of a whole population’s biodata, including DNA, is a gross violation of international human rights norms, and it’s even more disturbing if it is done surreptitiously, under the guise of a free health care program." For the ethnic minority Uyghur people, it is mandatory to undergo the biometrics collection, disguised under physical examination. Coercion to give blood sample is gross violation of the human rights and individual privacy.

Tibetans

Tibetans who opposed the diversion of irrigation water by Chinese authorities to the China Gold International Resources mining operations were detained, tortured and murdered. Allegations of what the PRC officially labelled 'judicial mutilation' against Tibetans by the Dalai Lama's government, and the serfdom controversy, have been cited by the PRC as reasons to interfere for what they claim was the welfare of Tibetans, although their claims of 'judicial mutilation' are controversial and subject to scepticism and dispute by foreign countries and international organizations. Conflicting reports about Tibetan human rights have been produced since then. The PRC claims that Tibet has been enjoying a cultural revival since the 1950s, whereas the Dalai Lama says 'whether intentionally or unintentionally, somewhere cultural genocide is taking place'.

Following the Chinese economic reform, businesspeople from other parts of China have made many business trips to Tibet, although most do not stay in region. The New York Times has cited this ethnic diversity in Tibet as a cause of "ethnic tensions". It has also disagreed significantly with the promotion by PRC authorities of home ownership in nomadic Tibetan societies. Western politicians often level the charge that the Tibetan languages are at risk of extinction in Tibet. Others, however, both inside and outside China and Tibet, claim that for a vast majority of Tibetans, who live in rural areas, the Chinese language is merely introduced as a second language in secondary school.

Uyghurs

Reportedly, the People's Republic of China is holding one million ethnic Uyghurs in internment camps in Xinjiang. In July 2019, ambassadors of 22 countries wrote a letter to the United Nations human rights officials condemning China's treatment towards the minority groups. Various human rights groups and former inmates have described the camps as “concentration camps”, where Muslim Uyghurs and other minorities have been forcibly assimilated into China's majority ethnic Han society. The letter urged China to “refrain from the arbitrary detention and restrictions on freedom of movement of Uighurs, and other Muslim and minority communities in Xinjiang.”

A leaked document known as "The China Cables" details the conditions in the aforementioned internment camps. These documents describe guidelines on a variety of things: preventing escapes, monitoring the Uyghurs, disciplining the Uyghurs, and much more. They are taught Mandarin and about Chinese culture. However, some claim this is renouncing their culture to conform to the communist party. Many Chinese officials have already dismissed the claims of breaching human rights and the contents of these documents. They refer to these camps as voluntary education centers where the Uyghurs are reeducated. The goal of these camps, according to former Chinese ambassador Liu Xiaoming, is to prevent terrorism. A United Nations assessment of human rights regarding the Xinjiang Uyghurs stated it is “reasonable to conclude that a pattern of large-scale arbitrary detention occurred in [vocational education and training centre] facilities, at least during 2017 to 2019,” negating previous Chinese Government claims that the facilities were schools or training centres where participants were free to join and leave. 

The Foreign, Commonwealth & Development Office (FCDO) gave statement on China’s human rights violations in Xinjiang, following a visit to the region by the UN High Commissioner for Human Rights. An FCDO spokesperson said, “It is clear that the Chinese authorities did not provide the full, unfettered access to Xinjiang for the UN High Commissioner for Human Rights that we and our international partners have long called for. China’s failure to grant such access only serves to highlight their determination to hide the truth.”

Economic and property rights

The National People's Congress enacted a law in 2007 to protect private property, with the exception of land. Nevertheless, according to Der Spiegel magazine, local Chinese authorities have used brutal means to expropriate property, in a bid to profit from the construction boom.

Rights related to sexuality

In 2001, homosexuality was removed from the official list of mental illnesses in China. China recognizes neither same-sex marriage nor civil unions.

According to the criminal law of the PRC, only females can be victims of rape, a man who has been raped cannot accuse the rapists (who can be men or women) of rape. However, the criminal law of the PRC's constitution in mainland China had been amended in August 2015. Thus, males can be victims of indecency, but the articles on the criminal law which are related to rape still remain unrevised, so male rape victims can only accuse the rapists of indecency.

Intersex rights

Intersex people in China suffer discrimination, lack of access to health care and coercive genital surgeries.

COVID-19 pandemic 
During the COVID-19 pandemic in China, the Chinese government has censored online criticism of its response to the pandemic, including criticism of its lockdown measures.

Other human rights issues

Workers' rights and privacy are contentious human rights issues in China. There have been several reports of core International Labour Organization conventions being denied to workers. One such report was released by the International Labor Rights Fund in October 2006; it documented minimum wage violations, long work hours, and inappropriate actions towards workers by management. Workers cannot form their own unions in the workplace; they may only join state-sanctioned ones. The extent to which these organizations can fight for the rights of Chinese workers is disputed.

The policy toward refugees from North Korea is a recurring human rights issue. It is official policy to repatriate these refugees to North Korea, but the policy is not evenly enforced and a considerable number of them stay in the People's Republic. Though it is in contravention of international law to deport political refugees, as illegal immigrants their situation is precarious. Their rights are not always protected, and some are tricked into marriage, forced to engage in cybersex or prostitution, allegedly linked to criminal networks generating an estimated annual revenue of $105,000,000 US.

African students in China have complained about their treatment in China.

Their complaints largely ignored until 19889, when 'students rose up in protest against what they called "Chinese apartheid. African officials took notice of the issue, and the Organization of African Unity issued an official protest. The organization's chairman, President Moussa Traoré of Mali, went on a fact-finding mission to China. A 1989 report in Guardian stated: 'these practices could threaten Peking's entire relationship with the continent.'

The United Nations reports that it has had difficulty in arranging official visits to China by UN Special Rapporteurs on various human rights issues.

On 29 June 2020, HRW urged the United Nation member countries to act upon the call by UN human rights experts to examine the Chinese government's human rights record.

On 3 July 2020, a 13-ton shipment of beauty products made out of human hair was seized by the U.S. Customs and Border Protection (CBP). The shipment, originating in Xinjiang, China, was seized at the Port of New York, signalling potential human rights abuses of forced labour and imprisonment.

On 9 September 2020, a global coalition of 321 civil society groups, including Amnesty International, urged United Nations to urgently create an independent international mechanism to address the Chinese government's human rights violations. In an open letter, the organizations highlighted China's rights violations worldwide, including the targeting of human rights defenders, global censorship and surveillance, and rights-free development that caused environmental degradation.

On 6 October 2020, 39 United Nations member countries expressed deep concerns over China's human rights violations in Xinjiang, Hong Kong, and Tibet. The call was made by Germany, supported by Britain, Canada, the United States, many European Union member states, Albania, Bosnia-Herzegovina, Haiti, Honduras, Palau, and the Marshall Islands.

A report published by Human Rights Watch in August 2021 documents the economic, social, and cultural rights violations resulting from the China-financed hydroelectric dam construction in northeaster Cambodia. Nearly 5,000 people have been displaced due to the dam's construction.

The World report 2022 by Human Rights Watch stated that the Chinese Communist Party under the leadership of Xi Jinping celebrated its 100th anniversary in 2021 amid crimes against humanity in Xinjiang and the devastation of civil liberties in Hong Kong. In 2021 the Chinese government tightened ideological control and increasingly cracked down on free speech. The Chinese government also moved quickly to offer support to Afghanistan’s abusive Taliban-controlled government.

Position of the government
The Government of the People's Republic of China has argued that its concept of 'Asian values' requires that the welfare of the collective should always be put ahead of the rights of any individual whenever conflicts between these arise. Its position is that the government has the responsibility to design, implement and enforce a 'harmonious socialist society'.

The People's Republic of China emphasizes state sovereignty, which at times conflicts with the international norms or standards of human rights.  However, its concept of human rights has developed radically over the years. From 1949 to the late 1970s, the CCP focused on promoting the rights of the masses: collective rights rather than individual human rights. Deng Xiaoping said that the right of a nation, or sovereignty (guoquan) is more important than human rights (renquan), and right of subsistence (shengcun quan) is more fundamental than political freedom. However, from the beginning of economic reforms in 1978 to the 1989 Tiananmen Square protests and massacre, the CCP raised concerns for human rights in their domestic and international policies. In 1991, China officially accepted the idea that human rights were compatible with Chinese socialism, and in 1993 the state created the China Society for Human Rights Studies, which has represented Chinese positions on human rights in international forums, conferences, and media. China went on to sign two treaties – the International Covenant on Economic, Social and Cultural Rights (ICESCR) and the International Covenant on Civil and Political Rights (ICCPR) in 1997 and 1998, respectively. The ICESCR was ratified by the National People's Congress in 2001, but as of 2016, the ICCPR has not yet been ratified. , the PRC had signed more than 20 international treaties on human rights.

Western human rights

Those who agree with the Chinese Communist Party point towards what they call rapid deterioration in Western societies, claiming that there has been an increase in geographic, religious and racial segregation, rising crime rates, family breakdown, industrial action, vandalism, and political extremism within Western societies. The European Union and the United Nations claim to be stopping these types of human rights violations, save for a few violations committed by some Western governments (e.g. the CIA's extraordinary rendition programme). The PRC holds the opinion, though, that many alleged negatives about democratic society are a direct result of an excess of individual freedom, saying that too much freedom is dangerous. The PRC holds that these actions in Western nations are all violations of human rights. They say that these should be taken into account when assessing a country's human rights record. On occasion they have criticized the United States policies, especially the human rights reports published by its State Department. They cite the opinion that the United States, as well as the United Kingdom, has also violated human rights laws, for example during the invasion of Iraq.

In United Nations bodies, China argues for a way of looking at the concept of universal human rights that differs from the Western view. China's view is that a focus on political rights and values is a too narrow view of human rights, and should instead focus on economic outcomes, material well-being of people, and national sovereignty.

Chinese definition
Chinese state media has stated that human rights should encompass what its officials have labelled as "economic standards of living and measures of health and economic prosperity".

Measures taken
In March 2003, an amendment was officially made to the Constitution of the People's Republic of China, officially stating that 'The State respects and preserves human rights.' In addition, China was dropped from a list of top ten human rights violators in the annual human rights report released by the U.S. State Department in 2008, though the report indicated that there were still widespread human rights-related issues in the PRC.

In 1988, the People's Republic of China began direct village elections to help maintain social and political order whilst facing rapid economic change. Elections now occur in about 650,000 villages across China, reaching 75% of the nation's 1.3 billion people, according to the Carter Center. In 2008, Shenzhen, which enjoys the highest per capita GDP in mainland China, was selected for experimentation, and over 70% of the government officials on the district level are to be directly elected (as of 2008). However, in keeping with Communist Party philosophy, candidates must be selected from a pre-approved list.

See also

 History of the Republic of China
 History of the People's Republic of China
 Human rights in Hong Kong
 Human rights in Macau
 Human rights in Taiwan
 Human rights in Tibet
 1989 Tiananmen Square protests and massacre
 Concerning the Situation in the Ideological Sphere
 Ecological migration
 Empowerment and Rights Institute
 Hong Kong Alliance in Support of Patriotic Democratic Movements of China
 Internet censorship in the People's Republic of China
 Human Rights in China (organization)
 Tangshan protest
 Dongzhou protests
 Penal system in China
 Laogai, "reform through [forced] labor"
 Re-education through labour
 List of prisons in the Tibet Autonomous Region
 List of concentration and internment camps#People's Republic of China
 Xinjiang internment camps
 Beijing Municipal Prison
 Qincheng Prison
 Black jails
 Xinfang
 Open Constitution Initiative
 Yan Xiaoling - Fan Yanqiong Case
 Cultural Revolution
 Chinese nationalism
 Sinocentrism
 Han chauvinism
 Han nationalism
 Sinicization
 Sinicization of Tibet
Incorporation of Xinjiang into the People's Republic of China
Boycotts of Chinese products may use some of the arguments in this article as their basis
 Ethnic issues in China
 List of Chinese nuclear tests
 Lop Nur Nuclear Weapons Test Base
 1987–1989 Tibetan unrest
 2008 Lhasa violence
 2010 Tibetan language protest
 Drapchi Prison
 International reactions to 2008 Tibetan protests
 Protests and uprisings in Tibet since 1950

References

Citations

Sources 

 "Country Cousins", The Economist, 8 April 2000.
 "Dalai Lama honours Tintin and Tutu", BBC News, 2 June 2006.
 "From politics to health policies: why they're in trouble", The Star, 6 February 2007.
 "Online encyclopedia Wikipedia founder raps firms aiding China censorship", Associated Press Financial Wire, 8 March 2007.
 "Profile: The Dalai Lama", BBC News, 25 April 2006.
 "Tutu calls on China to 'do the right thing' in Tibet", International Campaign for Tibet, 1 June 2006.
 United States Congressional Serial Set, United States Government Printing Office, 1993.
 "What do we expect the United Kingdom to do?", Tibet Vigil UK, June 2002. Retrieved 25 June 2006.
 Au Loong-yu, Nan Shan, Zhang Ping. Women Migrant Workers under the Chinese Social Apartheid, Committee for Asian Women, May 2007.
 Chan, Anita. China's Workers Under Assault: The Exploitation of Labor in a Globalizing Economy, M.E. Sharpe, 2001. 
 Chan, Anita & Senser, Robert A. "China's Troubled Workers", Foreign Affairs, March / April 1997.
 Ching, Frank. China: The Truth About Its Human Rights Record, Rider Books, 2008. 
 Elliott, Mark C. The Manchu Way: The 8 Banners and Ethnic Identity in Late Imperial China, Stanford University Press, 2001. 
 Goble, Paul. "China: Analysis From Washington – A Breakthrough For Tibet", World Tibet Network News, Canada Tibet Committee, 31 August 2001.
 Laquian, Aprodicio A. Beyond Metropolis: The Planning and Governance of Asia's Mega-Urban Regions, Johns Hopkins University Press, 2005. 
 Lasater, Martin L. & Conboy, Kenneth J. "Why the World Is Watching Beijing's Treatment of Tibet", The Heritage Foundation, 9 October 1987.
 Luard, Tim. "China rethinks peasant 'apartheid'", BBC News, 10 November 2005.
 Macleod, Calum. "China reviews 'apartheid' for 900 m peasants", The Independent, 10 June 2001.
 Neville-Hadley, Peter. Frommer's China, Frommers.com, 2003. 
 Robinson, Thomas W. & Shambaugh, David L. Chinese Foreign Policy: Theory and Practice, Oxford University Press. 
 Rosenthal, A.M. "China's 'Apartheid' Taiwan Policy." The New York Times, 4 December 1995.
 Snow, Phillip. "Third World Report: 'Chinese apartheid' threatens links with Africa", The Guardian, 20 January 1989.
 von Senger, Harro. "Chinese culture and human rights" (online available: pdf). In: Wolfgang Schmale (Hrsg.): "Human rights and cultural diversity: Europe, Arabic-Islamic world, Africa, China". Goldbach: Keip, 1993, pp. 281–333
 Waddington, Jeremy. Globalization and Patterns of Labour Resistance, Routledge, 1999. 
 Whitehouse, David. "Chinese workers and peasants in three phases of accumulation", Paper delivered at the Colloquium on Economy, Society and Nature, sponsored by the Centre for Civil Society at the University of KwaZulu-Natal, 2 March 2006. Retrieved 1 August 2007.
 Wildasin, David E. "Factor mobility, risk, inequality, and redistribution" in David Pines, Efraim Sadka, Itzhak Zilcha, Topics in Public Economics: Theoretical and Applied Analysis, Cambridge University Press, 1998. 
 Yao, Shunli. "China's WTO Revolution", Project Syndicate, June 2002

Further reading 

 Cheng, Lucie, Rossett, Arthur and Woo, Lucie, East Asian Law: Universal Norms and Local Cultures, RoutledgeCurzon, 2003, 
 Edwards, Catherine, China's Abuses Ignored for Profit, Insight on the News, Vol. 15, 20 December 1999.
 
 
 
 
 
 
 Sitaraman, Srini, Explaining China's Continued Resistance Towards Human Rights Norms: A Historical Legal Analysis, ACDIS Occasional Paper, Program in Arms Control, Disarmament, and International Security, University of Illinois, June 2008.
 Svensson, Marina, The Chinese Debate on Asian Values and Human Rights: Some Reflections on Relativism, Nationalism and Orientalism, in Brun, Ole. Human Rights and Asian Values: Contesting National Identities and Cultural Representations in Asia, Ole Bruun, Michael Jacobsen; Curzon, 2000, 
 Wang, Fei-Ling, Organizing through Division and Exclusion: China's Hukou System, Stanford University Press, 2005, 
 Zweig, David, Freeing China's Farmers: Rural Restructuring in the Reform Era, M. E. Sharpe, 1997, 
 The silent majority; China. (Life in a Chinese village), The Economist, April 2005
 China's Geography: Globalization and the Dynamics of Political, Economic, and Social Change
 Anwar Rahman. Sinicization Beyond the Great Wall: China's Xinjiang Uighur Autonomous Region

External links 
Review of China by the United Nations Human Rights Council's Universal Periodic Review, 7 February 2009
UN Human Development Report 2003 on China by the United Nations Development Programme
2004 Human Rights Report on China by the United States Department of State
Freedom House: China
Amnesty.org – China
Human Rights in China (hrchina.org)

 
Political controversies in China
Political repression in China
Political abuses of psychiatry
Torture in China